MDY may refer to:

 MDY, month–day–year format for writing out dates
 MDY, IATA airport code for Henderson Field (Midway Atoll)
 MDY Industries, creator of the Glider bot software
 MDY, NYSE Arca ticker symbol for MidCap 400 SPDR, an American exchange-traded fund